Oscar Alfred "Sonny" Olson Jr. (November 2, 1917 – August 31, 1997) was an American professional basketball player. He played for the Oshkosh All-Stars for two games in the National Basketball League during the 1939–40 season and averaged 2.0 points per game.

References

External links
 Carleton College Hall of Fame profile

1917 births
1997 deaths
All-American college men's basketball players
American men's basketball players
United States Army personnel of World War II
Basketball players from Minnesota
Basketball players from North Dakota
Carleton Knights baseball players
Carleton Knights men's basketball players
Forwards (basketball)
Oshkosh All-Stars players
People from Braham, Minnesota